María Blanca Caridad Ogilvie Clark Peralta, known by her stage name Patricia Morán (10 September 1925 – 24 October 2022), was a Mexican actress and socialite. She was the wife of Governor of Chihuahua Oscar Flores Sánchez, who served from 1968 to 1974.

Morán died in Mexico City on 24 October 2022, at the age of 97.

Filmography

Voice-over and dubbing 
 Kalimán - Profanadores de tumbas ... Jane Farrell

Television 
 Gran teatro (1963) ... Episodio «Cyrano De Bergerac»
 Teatro del cuatro (1964)

Films 
 Una virgen moderna (1946) 
 Camino de Sacramento (1946) ... Chica rubia en baile, no acreditada
 La mujer de todos (1946) ... Angélica
 Lágrimas de sangre (1946) ... Alicia
 Belami, la historia de un canalla (1947) ... Susana
 Yo soy tu padre (1948) ... Elisa
 Negra consentida (1949) ... Marta
 Cuando los padres se quedan solos (1949) ... Carlota
 Nosotros los rateros (1949) ... Elena
 Zorina, la mujer maldita (1949) ... Rosa María
 Otra primavera (1950) ... Cristina
 Médico de guardia (1950) ... La Moribunda, Carmen Rosado
 El amor no es negocio (1950) ... Susana
 La edad peligrosa (1950) ... Patricia
 La malcasada (1950)
 Muchachas de Uniforme (1951) ... María Teresa
 Cerca del cielo (1951) ... Cristina
 Dos vidas (1952)
 El ángel exterminador (1962)
 Si yo fuera millonario (1962)
 Romeo contra Julieta (1968) ... Mamá de Rodolfo
 El golfo (1969)
 ¿Por qué nací mujer? (1970) ... Tía Doro

Film producer 
 Casting (2014) ... cortometraje, auxiliar de producción

Telenovelas 
 Gutierritos (1958) ... Elena
 Puerta de suspenso (1959)
 Secretaria o mujer (1960)
 La casa del odio (1960)
 La sospecha (1961)
 La gloria quedó atrás (1962)
 Pablo y Elena (1963) ... Elena
 Madres egoístas (1963)
 La máscara del ángel (1964)
 La sembradora (1965)
 La búsqueda (1966)
 Gutierritos (1966) ... Elena
 El dolor de amar (1966)
 Amor y orgullo (1966) ... Ruth
 Detrás del muro (1967)
 Atormentada (1967) ... Margarita Alfaro
 Mi Maestro (1968)
 Aurelia (1968)

Award nominations

References

1925 births
2022 deaths
Mexican film actresses
Mexican television actresses
First ladies and gentlemen of Chihuahua (state)
People from Tampico, Tamaulipas